Grevillea georgeana  is a species of flowering plant in the family Proteaceae and is endemic to inland areas of south-western Western Australia. It is an erect to widely spreading shrub with deeply divided leaves, the end lobes linear and sharply pointed, and scarlet to bright reddish-pink and cream-coloured flowers.

Description
The edges of the leaflets are rolled under, enclosing most of the lower surface.

Taxonomy
Grevillea georgeana was first formally described in 1986 by Donald McGillivray in his book New Names in Grevillea (Proteaceae), based on specimens collected on the Die Hardy Range north of Southern Cross in 1976. The specific epithet (georgeana) honours Alex George, who, with McGillivray, collected the type specimens.

Distribution and habitat
This grevillea grows in open shrubland in shallow, stony soils in the ranges north of Southern Cross between Koolyanobbing and Diemals.

Conservation status
Grevillea georgeana is classified as "Priority Three" by the Government of Western Australia Department of Biodiversity, Conservation and Attractions, meaning that it is poorly known and known from only a few locations but is not under imminent threat.

References

georgeana
Eudicots of Western Australia
Proteales of Australia
Plants described in 1986
Taxa named by Donald McGillivray